The following is the list of Belgian Ambassadors to the Holy See, past and present. A Belgian Ambassador serves as that country's official representative to the Holy See since formal diplomatic relations began in 1832. Between 1880 and 1885 there were no diplomatic relations between Belgium and the Holy See.

List of ambassadors
 1832 – 1835 : Charles Vilain XIIII
 1836 – 1838 : Prosper Edouard Noyer
 1837 : Charles Vilain XIIII
 1838 – 1844 : Émile d'Oultremont de Wégimont
 1844 – 1846 : Charles van den Steen de Jehay
 1846 – 1847 : Joseph de Riquet de Caraman
 1848 – 1849 : Eugène de Ligne
 1849 – 1850 : Emile de Meester de Ravestein
 1850 – 1850 : Henri de Brouckère
 1850 – 1859 : Emile de Meester de Ravestein
 1959 – 1867 : Henri Carolus
 1875 – 1880 : Auguste d’Anethan
 1885 – 1888 : Charles de Pitteurs-Hiegaerts
 1889 – 1894 : Edouard Whettnall
 1894 – 1896 : Théodore de Bounder de Melsbrœck
 1896 - 1915 : Baron d’Erp
 1915 - 1918 : Jules Van den Heuvel
 1919 - 1921 : Count Léo d'Ursel
 1921 - 1924 : Baron Eugène Beyens
 1924 - 1926 : Stefano Ruzette (Envoy)
 1926 - 1935 : Max van Ypersele de Strihou
 1935 - 1937 : Baron Ruggero de Borchgrave
 1938 - 1939 : Bernardo de l’Escaille
 1939 - 1945 : Adriano Nieuwenhuys
 1946 - 1948 : Prince Reginaldo de Cröy
 1948 - 1953 : Baron Alexandre Paternotte de La Vaillée
 1953 - 1957 : Viscount Joseph Berryer
 1957 - 1968 : Baron Prosper Poswick
 1968 - 1972 : Albert Hupperts
 1972 - 1976 : Prince Werner de Merode
 1976 - 1977 : Willy Verriest
 1977 - 1980 : Felix Standaert
 1980 - 1984 : Baron Eugène Rittweger de Moor
 1984 - 1988 : Baron Alexandre Paternotte de La Vaillée
 1988 - 1991 : Ferdinand De Wilde
 1991 - 1994 : Baron Henri Beyens
 1994 - 1998 : Juan Cassiers
 1998 - 2002 : Thierry Muûls
 2002 - 2006 : Benoît Cardon de Lichtbuer
 2006 - 2010 : Frank E. de Coninck
 2010 - 2014 : Charles Ghislain
 2014 - ... : Bruno Nève de Mévergnies

See also
 Diplomatic missions of Belgium
 Foreign relations of Belgium

Sources
 Ambassadors to the Holy See
 l’Ambassade de Belgique près le Saint-Siège à Rome (French)
 Le Saint-Siège et le Vatican (French)

 
See Holy
Belgium